Elections to North Wiltshire District Council were held on 3 May 2007.  The whole council was up for election, and the Conservatives gained overall control, winning thirty-nine of the fifty-four seats available.

This was the last election of district councillors to take place in North Wiltshire. The following year, a government review of local government determined that the four district councils of Wiltshire were to be merged with Wiltshire County Council to form a new unitary authority with effect from 1 April 2009, when North Wiltshire would be abolished and its councillors' term of office would end two years early.

Elections to the new unitary authority, Wiltshire Council, took place in June 2009.

Election result

|}

Electoral division results

Box and Rudloe

Bremhill

Brinkworth

Calne Abberd

Calne Chilvester

Calne Lickhill

Calne Marden

Calne Priestley

Calne Quemerford

Calne Without

Chippenham Allington

Chippenham Avon

Chippenham Hill Rise

Chippenham London Road

Chippenham Monkton Park

Chippenham Park

Chippenham Pewsham

Chippenham Redland

Chippenham Westcroft/Queens

Colerne

Corsham and Lacock

Cricklade

Hullavington and Crudwell

Kington Langley

The Lydiards and Broad Town

Lyneham

Malmesbury

Minety and Purton

Pickwick

St Paul Malmesbury Without

Sherston

Sutton Benger

Wootton Bassett North

Wootton Bassett South

Yatton Keynell

See also
North Wiltshire District Council elections

References

2007
2007 English local elections
2000s in Wiltshire